Sanjay Kirloskar is an Indian industrialist and the chairman of the Kirloskar Brothers Ltd (a Kirloskar Group company), one of the largest conglomerate corporations in India. He is also the President of All India Management Association.

Under his leadership Kirloskar Brothers Ltd is India's largest pump manufacturer, which produces centrifugal pumps from 0.1 kW to 26 MW.

Early life
Sanjay Kirloskar is the son of Chandrakant Kirloskar and the grandson of Shantanurao Laxmanrao Kirloskar. He graduated with a Bachelor of Science degree in mechanical engineering from the Illinois Institute of Technology, Chicago in 1978.

Career
Kirloskar Brothers acquired SPP Pumps (UK),  in 2002 and then Aban Construction, one of India's leading construction companies in 2006, followed by The Kolhapur Steels limited in 2007 and Braybar Pumps Ltd (South Africa) in 2010, Syncroflo Inc (USA) in 2014 and Rodelta Pumps International B.V. (The Netherlands) in 2015. For the last 5 years Kirloskar Brothers has shown an average RONW (Return on Net Worth) of 32%.

Kirloskar Brothers Ltd received the ASME N-STAMP in 2012 and is the first Indian company in rotating equipment to receive this as well as amongst a few companies in the world to have this accreditation.

Mr. Sanjay Kirloskar also setup the all women operated and managed manufacturing plant of Kirloskar Brothers Ltd at Coimbatore as part of a drive to have more women in the core engineering industry. Coimbatore is the second largest metropolitan city of state Tamil Nadu in India. Today Kirloskar Brothers is India's largest Pump& Valve manufacturer and one of the World's largest Pump manufacturer's by market capitalization.

References

External links
Sanjay Kirloskar and Alok Kirloskar on NDTV Profit
Time Magazine article on Mr. S.L. Kirloskar

1957 births
Indian billionaires
Living people
Marathi people
Businesspeople from Nagpur